An Australian Parsonage, or the Settler and the Savage in Western Australia (1872) is an account of life in Western Australia, particularly York, written by Janet Millett, the wife of clergyman Edward Millett, who was the priest of Holy Trinity Church, York from late 1863 until early 1869. It has been described as one of three outstanding books by early settlers, who commented on 19th-century Australian life.

Writing
The book was “founded on a diary kept by the writer” while she was in Western Australia.  Her husband, Edward, contributed some of the “latter chapters”.

Publication
The book was published in January 1872 by Edward Stanford, 6 & 7 Charing Cross, London.

Contents
The book contains “graphic sketches of the writer’s own experiences as a chaplain’s wife, during five years spent in Western Australia”.
The book includes comments on
The journey from Fremantle to York
Life and personalities of York
The difficulties of housekeeping
Bushfires
The summer heat
The Aboriginal inhabitants
Convicts
Pensioner guards
The sandalwood trade
Publicans and storekeepers 
The truck system.

An index to the book is on website of The York Society, Inc, https://theyorksociety.com.  According to The York Society, some of the un-named persons in the book may be as follows:
The Irish priest on board ship on page 14 is Fr Matthew Gibney
The Yorkshire lady on pages 9, 10, 32 and 33 is Mary Dinsdale 
The shoemaker on page 247 is likely to be her husband William Dinsdale Snr 
The French convict on page 250 is Aimable Duperouzel
The settler on pages 118 to 120 and on page 176 must be John Taylor
The schoolmaster on pages 405-406 was probably John William Veal.

Reviews
The book was reviewed 60 times in 1872 and in the following years, was cited as an important source of information and a valuable insight into the way of life in York at the time.

Notes

References 

Australian non-fiction books
Books about Western Australia
York, Western Australia